The 1969 Women's World Chess Championship was won by Nona Gaprindashvili, who successfully defended her title against challenger Alla Kushnir. This was the second of three consecutive title matches between the two strongest female players of their time.

1967 Candidates Tournament

The Candidates Tournament was held in Subotica in September and October 1967. Unlike the previous tournament three years before, Kushnir won this one outright and again earned the right to challenge the reigning champion Gaprindashvili.

{| class="wikitable"
|+ 1967 Women's Candidates Tournament
|-
! !! Player !! 1 !! 2 !! 3 !! 4 !! 5 !! 6 !! 7 !! 8 !! 9 !! 10 !! 11 !! 12 !! 13 !! 14 !! 15 !! 16 !! 17 !! 18 !! Points !! Tie break
|- style="background:#cfc;"
| 1 ||  || - || 0 || ½ || 1 || 1 || 1 || 1 || 1 || 1 || 1 || ½ || 1 || 0 || ½ || 1 || 1 || 1 || 1 || 13½ || 
|-
| 2 ||  || 1 || - || ½ || ½ || 1 || 1 || 1 || 0 || 1 || ½ || 1 || 0 || 1 || 0 || 1 || 1 || 1 || 1 || 12½ || 101.75
|-
| 3 ||  || ½ || ½ || - || 1 || 0 || 0 || ½ || ½ || 1 || ½ || 1 || 1 || 1 || 1 || 1 || 1 || 1 || 1 || 12½ || 92.00
|-
| 4 ||  || 0 || ½ || 0 || - || 1 || ½ || 1 || 1 || 1 || 1 || 0 || 1 || 1 || ½ || ½ || 1 || 1 || 1 || 12 || 
|-
| 5 ||  || 0 || 0 || 1 || 0 || - || ½ || 0 || 1 || 1 || ½ || 1 || 1 || ½ || 1 || ½ || 1 || 1 || 1 || 11 || 
|-
| 6 ||  || 0 || 0 || 1 || ½ || ½ || - || ½ || 0 || 1 || ½ || 1 || 1 || ½ || ½ || 1 || 1 || ½ || 1 || 10½ || 
|-
| 7 ||  || 0 || 0 || ½ || 0 || 1 || ½ || - || 1 || ½ || 1 || ½ || ½ || 1 || ½ || 1 || 1 || 0 || 1 || 10 || 74.75
|-
| 8 ||  || 0 || 1 || ½ || 0 || 0 || 1 || 0 || - || ½ || 1 || 1 || 0 || 1 || ½ || 1 || 1 || 1 || ½ || 10 || 74.00
|-
| 9 ||  || 0 || 0 || 0 || 0 || 0 || 0 || ½ || ½ || - || 1 || 1 || 1 || 1 || 1 || 1 || 1 || 1 || 1 || 10 || 61.00
|-
| 10 ||  || 0 || ½ || ½ || 0 || ½ || ½ || 0 || 0 || 0 || - || ½ || 1 || ½ || ½ || ½ || 1 || 1 || 1 || 8 || 
|-
| 11 ||  || ½ || 0 || 0 || 1 || 0 || 0 || ½ || 0 || 0 || ½ || - || ½ || 0 || 1 || 1 || 0 || 1 || 1 || 7 || 49.25
|-
| 12 ||  || 0 || 1 || 0 || 0 || 0 || 0 || ½ || 1 || 0 || 0 || ½ || - || 0 || ½ || 1 || ½ || 1 || 1 || 7 || 48.50
|-
| 13 ||  || 1 || 0 || 0 || 0 || ½ || ½ || 0 || 0 || 0 || ½ || 1 || 1 || - || ½ || 0 || 0 || 1 || ½ || 6½ || 
|-
| 14 ||  || ½ || 1 || 0 || ½ || 0 || ½ || ½ || ½ || 0 || ½ || 0 || ½ || ½ || - || 0 || ½ || 0 || 0 || 5½ || 53.50
|-
| 15 ||  || 0 || 0 || 0 || ½ || ½ || 0 || 0 || 0 || 0 || ½ || 0 || 0 || 1 || 1 || - || 1 || ½ || ½ || 5½ || 35.50
|-
| 16 ||  || 0 || 0 || 0 || 0 || 0 || 0 || 0 || 0 || 0 || 0 || 1 || ½ || 1 || ½ || 0 || - || ½ || 1 || 4½ || 
|-
| 17 ||  || 0 || 0 || 0 || 0 || 0 || ½ || 1 || 0 || 0 || 0 || 0 || 0 || 0 || 1 || ½ || ½ || - || ½ || 4 || 
|-
| 18 ||  || 0 || 0 || 0 || 0 || 0 || 0 || 0 || ½ || 0 || 0 || 0 || 0 || ½ || 1 || ½ || 0 || ½ || - || 3 || 
|}

1969 Championship Match

The championship match was played in Tbilisi and Moscow in 1969. Once again, there was never really any doubt about who was the strongest of the two players.

{| class="wikitable" style="text-align:center"
|+Women's World Championship Match 1969
|-
! !! 1 !! 2 !! 3 !! 4 !! 5 !! 6 !! 7 !! 8 !! 9 !! 10 !! 11 !! 12 !! 13 !! Total
|-
| align=left | 
| 1 ||style="background:black; color:white"| ½ || 0 ||style="background:black; color:white"| 1 || 0 ||style="background:black; color:white"| 0 || ½ ||style="background:black; color:white"| 0 || ½ ||style="background:black; color:white"| 0 || ½ ||style="background:black; color:white"| 0 || ½ || 4½
|-
| align=left | 
|style="background:black; color:white"| 0 || ½ ||style="background:black; color:white"| 1 || 0 ||style="background:black; color:white"| 1 || 1 ||style="background:black; color:white"| ½ || 1 ||style="background:black; color:white"| ½ || 1 ||style="background:black; color:white"| ½ || 1 ||style="background:black; color:white"| ½ || 8½
|}

Games of Match 
Gaprindashvili-Kushnir Title Match 1969 13 games on chessgames.com
Gaprindashvili-Kushnir Title Match 1969 13 games on 365chess.com
Gaprindashvili-Kushnir Title Match 1969 13 games on chesstempo.com

References

Women's World Chess Championships
1969 in chess